Roman Guennadievitch Klimov (born 19 January 1985) is a Russian former professional road cyclist.

Major results
2007
 1st Grand Prix of Moscow
 2nd Overall Grand Prix of Sochi
1st Stages 3 & 4 (ITT)
 2nd Overall Tour of Hainan
1st Stage 6
2008
 2nd Overall Grand Prix of Sochi
1st Stage 4
 3rd Overall Circuito Montañés
1st Stage 4
 8th Overall Volta a Lleida
2010
 10th Mayor Cup

References

1985 births
Living people
Russian male cyclists
Place of birth missing (living people)